Grimsås IF is a Swedish football club located in Grimsås.

Background
Grimsås IF currently plays in Division 4 Västergötland Södra which is the sixth tier of Swedish football. They play their home matches at the Grimsborg in Grimsås.

The club is affiliated to Västergötlands Fotbollförbund.

Season to season

Footnotes

External links
 Grimsås IF – Official website

Football clubs in Västra Götaland County